Fire control technician (abbreviated as FT) is a  United States Navy occupational rating.

Fire control technicians perform organizational and intermediate level maintenance on United States Navy submarines combat control systems and equipment, and associated test equipment including tactical computer systems and peripherals.

The Fire Control Technician (FT) is responsible for all operational and administrative aspects of the submarines computer and control mechanisms used in weapons systems and related programs.

See also
List of United States Navy ratings

References
 
http://www.public.navy.mil/bupers-npc/career/enlistedcareeradmin/Pages/default1.aspx
http://usmilitary.about.com/od/enlistedjob1/a/ft.htm

United States Navy ratings